"Alone, Pt. II" is a song by British-Norwegian record producer and DJ Alan Walker and American singer Ava Max, released by Sony Music on 27 December 2019. It is a sequel to Walker's single "Alone" (2016). Many remixes of the song were published, among which those by Rave Republic, Toby Romeo, RetroVision, Da Tweekaz, and one by Alex Skrindo, in collaboration with Sebastian Wibe. Much like the original, "Alone, Pt. II" also garnered critical acclaim.

Critical reception
Jason Lipshutz of Billboard praised the song, stating that it "demonstrates the evolution of Walker’s production techniques". He also described Max's vocals as "a moment designed for glass-clinking, unified swaying and other forms of party camaraderie".

Music video
The official music video of the song was uploaded on Walker's YouTube channel on 27 December 2019. It is the sequel to the video of "Alone", Walker's 2016 single made by him, as it is very obvious in the name. The Kristian Berg directed video was filmed in the Vietnamese province of Quảng Bình between 2 and 10 April 2019, in locations such as the Sơn Đoòng cave, Tróoc river, Chay river, Tra Ang bridge, Doong village, En cave and Nuoc Nut cave. A second video, also directed by Kristian Berg, was released on 17 February 2020, and was filmed live at the Château de Fontainebleau castle in France. As of October 2022, the video has amassed over 275 million views and 4.6 million likes.

Personnel
Credits adapted from Tidal.

 Alan Walker – producer, songwriting, programmer
 Ava Max – vocals, songwriting
 Erik Smaaland – producer, songwriting
 Henry Walter – songwriting, vocal producer, co-producer, background vocals
 Markus Arnbekk – songwriting, background vocals, co-producer, guitar, programmer
 Carl Hovind – songwriting, co-producer, programmer
 Fredrik Borch Olsen – songwriting
 Gunnar Greve – songwriting, executive producer
 Alexander Standal Pavelich – songwriting, guitar
 Halvor Folstad – songwriting
 Dag Holtan-Hartwig – songwriting
 Moa Pettersson Hammar – songwriting
 Øyvind Sauvik – songwriting
 Big Fred – co-producer, programmer
 Jakob Emtestam – executive producer
 Sören von Malmborg – mastering engineer, mixing engineer

Charts

Weekly charts

Year-end charts

Certifications

References 

2019 singles
2019 songs
Alan Walker (music producer) songs
Ava Max songs
Sequel songs
Number-one singles in Belgium
Ultratop 50 Singles (Flanders) number-one singles
Songs written by Alan Walker (music producer)
Songs written by Gunnar Greve
Song recordings produced by Cirkut (record producer)
Songs written by Ava Max